Mario Antoine Elie (born November 26, 1963) is an American basketball coach and former basketball player in the National Basketball Association (NBA). Elie grew up in New York City and played college basketball at American International College, before being drafted in the seventh round of the 1985 NBA draft as the 160th overall pick by the Milwaukee Bucks.

Elie began his professional basketball career with Ireland's Killester in 1986. He went on to play in Portugal and Argentina, as well as in the USBL, CBA and WBL. Elie first played in the NBA in 1990 for the Philadelphia 76ers and went on to play for the Golden State Warriors, Portland Trail Blazers, Houston Rockets, San Antonio Spurs and Phoenix Suns. A role player known for his defense and toughness, Elie won three NBA championships: two with the Rockets in 1994 and 1995, and one with the Spurs in 1999.

Elie began his coaching career in 2003 as an assistant with the Spurs, and later held similar positions with the Dallas Mavericks, Sacramento Kings, New Jersey/Brooklyn Nets, and Orlando Magic.

Early life
Elie, who is of Haitian heritage, was born and raised in the Manhattan borough of New York City. He was named "Mario" for opera singer Mario Lanza. 

Elie attended Power Memorial Academy. After being cut from the freshman basketball team, Elie made the junior varsity team the following season; one of his teammates was future NBA star Chris Mullin.

Early career
After Division I schools failed to recruit him, Elie played college basketball at the Division II level for American International College in Springfield, Massachusetts. He led AIC to the NCAA Division II Tournament Quarter-Final and became the school's all-time leading scorer. He was selected with the 160th pick (out of 162 total) in the 1985 NBA draft by the Milwaukee Bucks, but was cut from the team during training camp. 

In 1986, Elie started his professional career in Ireland with Killester, where he won Player of the Year honors. Elie played for the USBL's Miami Tropics, Elie played eight games in Argentina with Unión de Santa Fe. He then spent two seasons in Portugal with Ovarense, helping them win their first national title. He spent the 1989–90 season with the CBA's Albany Patroons. He was named to the All-CBA First Team in 1989–1990 and 1990–1991.

NBA career
In December 1990, he made his NBA debut, joining the Philadelphia 76ers on a 10-day contract. He played three games for the 76ers between December 28 and January 2. In February 1991, he joined the Golden State Warriors, where he remained for the rest of the 1990–91 season as well as the 1991–92 season. Elie spent the 1992–93 season with the Portland Trail Blazers before being traded to the Houston Rockets prior to the 1993–94 season.

Elie won two NBA championships with the Rockets, one in 1994 and one in 1995. During this period, Elie was dubbed the "Junkyard Dog" by his teammates. One highlight of Elie's career came when he hit a game-winning three-pointer in Game 7 of the 1995 Western Conference Semifinals against the Phoenix Suns to break a tie with 7.1 seconds. The shot is called the "Kiss of Death" by Rockets fans, as Elie made a taunting kissing gesture towards the Suns' bench after the shot. While Elie was a key role player for the Rockets off the bench throughout the regular season and the playoffs, he became a starter in the 1995 NBA Finals. This move paid off for the Rockets, as Elie averaged 16.3 points per game in the Finals while shooting 65% from the field.

Elie played for the Rockets through the 1997–98 season and then signed with the San Antonio Spurs, where he played for two seasons. The Spurs reportedly signed Elie in an effort to add "nastiness" to their team. Elie started for the Spurs for much of the season. With Elie, the Spurs won their first-ever NBA championship in 1999.

After playing the 2000–01 season for the Phoenix Suns, Elie retired. He finished his career with 6,265 points in 732 NBA games.

In 2007, Elie was inducted into the New York Basketball Hall of Fame. He has been named one of the top ten players in Houston Rockets history.

During his playing career, Elie was a role player who performed well in clutch situations. He had a reputation as a tough defender, a fierce competitor, and an accurate outside shooter.

Coaching career
On September 28, 2007, Elie was hired by the Dallas Mavericks as an assistant coach. He served with the Mavericks for one season. On June 22, 2009, Paul Westphal hired Elie as an assistant coach for the Sacramento Kings. On December 8, 2011, Elie was added to former teammate Avery Johnson's coaching staff with the New Jersey Nets. On June 26, 2015, he was hired by the Orlando Magic as an assistant coach.

Personal life 
Elie is married to Gina Gaston, a journalist and anchorwoman for Houston's Channel ABC13. Elie and Gaston have triplets.

Elie speaks four languages: English and French from growing up in a Haitian-Creole household, Portuguese from playing pro basketball in Portugal, and Spanish from playing in Argentina.

In December 2010, Elie was arrested in Sacramento, California for allegedly driving while intoxicated.

NBA career statistics

Regular season 

|-
| style="text-align:left;"| 
| style="text-align:left;"|Philadelphia
| 3 || 0 || 6.7 || .286 || .500 || .500 || 0.3 || 0.3 || 0.0 || 0.0 || 2.0
|-
| style="text-align:left;"| 
| style="text-align:left;"|Golden State
| 30 || 0 || 20.8 || .507 || .375 || .500 || 3.6 || 1.5 || 0.6 || 0.3 || 7.7
|-
| style="text-align:left;"| 
| style="text-align:left;"|Golden State
| 79 || 32 || 21.2 || .521 || .329 || .852 || 2.9 || 2.2 || 0.9 || 0.2 || 7.8
|-
| style="text-align:left;"| 
| style="text-align:left;"|Portland
| 82 || 7 || 21.4 || .458 || .349 || .855 || 2.6 || 2.2 || 0.9 || 0.2 || 8.6
|-
| style="text-align:left;background:#afe6ba;"|  †
| style="text-align:left;"|Houston
| 67 || 8 || 24.0 || .446 || .355 || .860 || 2.7 || 3.1 || 0.7 || 0.1 || 9.3
|-
| style="text-align:left;background:#afe6ba;"|  †
| style="text-align:left;"|Houston
| 81 || 13 || 23.4 || .499 || .398 || .842 || 2.4 || 2.3 || 0.8 || 0.1 || 8.8
|-
| style="text-align:left;"| 
| style="text-align:left;"|Houston
| 45 || 16 || 30.8 || .504 || .323 || .852 || 3.4 || 3.1 || 1.0 || 0.2 || 11.1
|-
| style="text-align:left;"| 
| style="text-align:left;"|Houston
| 78 || 77 || 34.4 || .497 || .420 || .896 || 3.0 || 4.0 || 1.2 || 0.2 || 11.7
|-
| style="text-align:left;"| 
| style="text-align:left;"|Houston
| 73 || 59 || 27.2 || .452 || .291 || .833 || 2.1 || 3.0 || 1.1 || 0.1 || 8.4
|-
| style="text-align:left;background:#afe6ba;"|  †
| style="text-align:left;"|San Antonio
| 47 || 37 || 27.5 || .471 || .374 || .866 || 2.9 || 1.9 || 1.0 || 0.3 || 9.7
|-
| style="text-align:left;"| 
| style="text-align:left;"|San Antonio
| 79 || 79 || 28.1 || .427 || .398 || .846 || 3.2 || 2.4 || 0.9 || 0.1 || 7.5
|-
| style="text-align:left;"| 
| style="text-align:left;"|Phoenix
| 68 || 67 || 22.1 || .423 || .360 || .797 || 2.3 || 1.9 || 0.9 || 0.2 || 4.4
|- class="sortbottom"
| style="text-align:center;" colspan="2"| Career
| 732 || 395 || 25.5 || .473 || .365 || .854 || 2.8 || 2.6 || 0.9 || 0.2 || 8.6

Playoffs 

|-
|style="text-align:left;"|1991
|style="text-align:left;"|Golden State
|9||7||21.9||.500||1.000||.844||3.6||1.4||0.6||0.1||9.3
|-
|style="text-align:left;"|1992
|style="text-align:left;"|Golden State
|4||2||20.0||.639||1.000||.667||5.5||2.5||1.3||0.0||12.5
|-
|style="text-align:left;"|1993
|style="text-align:left;"|Portland
|4||0||13.0||.500||1.000||.889||1.5||1.0||0.5||0.3||5.0
|-
| style="text-align:left;background:#afe6ba;"|1994†
|style="text-align:left;"|Houston
|23||0||16.6||.396||.313||.851||1.7||1.7||0.3||0.1||5.8
|-
| style="text-align:left;background:#afe6ba;"|1995†
|style="text-align:left;"|Houston
|22||6||28.9||.504||.431||.795||2.8||2.5||1.0||0.0||9.1
|-
|style="text-align:left;"|1996
|style="text-align:left;"|Houston
|8||0||29.1||.439||.375||.917||2.8||1.8||0.9||0.4||9.8
|-
|style="text-align:left;"|1997
|style="text-align:left;"|Houston
|16||16||37.4||.466||.400||.839||3.5||3.8||0.9||0.3||11.5
|-
|style="text-align:left;"|1998
|style="text-align:left;"|Houston
|5||1||26.6||.444||.333||.667||2.6||1.2||0.4||0.0||6.6
|-
| style="text-align:left;background:#afe6ba;"|1999†
|style="text-align:left;"|San Antonio
|17||17||30.9||.384||.267||.837||3.5||2.9||1.3||0.1||7.9
|-
| style="text-align:left;|2000
|style="text-align:left;"|San Antonio
|4||4||28.8||.273||.143||.944||4.3||1.8||1.3||0.0||7.5
|-
| style="text-align:left;|2001
|style="text-align:left;"|Phoenix
|4||4||25.8||.452||.154||.750||3.3||1.8||0.8||0.3||9.0
|- class="sortbottom"
| style="text-align:center;" colspan="2"| Career
| 116 || 57 || 26.3 || .452 || .367 || .836 || 2.9 || 2.3 || 0.8 || 0.1 || 8.5

References

External links 

1963 births
Living people
Albany Patroons players
American expatriate basketball people in Argentina
American expatriate basketball people in Ireland
American expatriate basketball people in Portugal
American International Yellow Jackets men's basketball players
American men's basketball players
American sportspeople of Haitian descent
Basketball coaches from New York (state)
Basketball players from New York City
Brooklyn Nets assistant coaches
Dallas Mavericks assistant coaches
Golden State Warriors assistant coaches
Golden State Warriors players
Houston Rockets players
Milwaukee Bucks draft picks
New Jersey Nets assistant coaches
Orlando Magic assistant coaches
Philadelphia 76ers players
Phoenix Suns players
Portland Trail Blazers players
Sacramento Kings assistant coaches
San Antonio Spurs players
Shooting guards
Small forwards
Sportspeople from Manhattan
Unión de Santa Fe basketball players
United States Basketball League players